The 22nd Filipino Academy of Movie Arts and Sciences Awards Night was held in 1974 at the Manila Hilton Hotel.  This ceremony will give recognition to the movies that was made for the year 1973. 

Nueva Vizcaya of Rosa Film won the most coveted FAMAS Award for Best Picture including the best Supporting Actor Award for  Eddie Garcia.  It was also the first time in the history of FAMAS that a Father & son and Mother & daughter won an acting award. Ramon Revilla for best actor and Marlon Bautista for best child actor for the film Hulihin si Tyagong Akyat and Gloria Sevilla for best actress and her daughter Nadia Veloso(Suzette Ranillo) for Best Supporting actress for the movie Gimingaw AKo.

Awards

Major Awards
Winners are listed first and highlighted with boldface.

Special Awardee

FAMAS Lifetime Achievement Award 
Imelda Marcos

POSTHUMOUS Award 
Vic Pacia

Lou Salvador Sr. Memorial  Award 
Katy de la Cruz

Gregorio Valdez Memorial  Award 
Guillermo de la Vega

Don Ciriaco Santiago Memorial  Award 
Joseph Estrada

References

External links
FAMAS Awards 

FAMAS Award
FAMAS
FAMAS